The Decca Years is a compilation of the three first albums from the Swedish group Kaipa, released under the Decca label during the years of 1975 to 1978. It also includes two previously unreleased albums.

Containing albums
Kaipa (1975)
Inget Nytt Under Solen (1976)
Solo (1978)
Live (Previously Unreleased)
1974 Unedited Master Demo Recording (Previously Unreleased)

2005 compilation albums
Kaipa albums